"Danger! High Voltage" is a song by American rock band Electric Six. It was released as the band's debut single and the lead single from their debut studio album, Fire (2003), in 2002 as a 7-inch vinyl. It was re-released by XL Recordings on January 6, 2003. It peaked at number two on the UK Singles Chart. It received positive reviews from critics and was named Single of the Week by the NME.

Background
The song was originally recorded in early 2000, when the band was under the name the Wildbunch. They were forced to drop this name following legal pressure from the Bristol trip hop collective of the same name. The later album and single version was produced by British music producers, Damien Mendis and Stuart Bradbury—who also created club mixes under the name of Soulchild.

Jack White of the White Stripes, a fellow Detroit native, performed the secondary lead vocals on the track. Members of the band have claimed in interviews that the singer was an auto mechanic named John S. O'Leary and not White, although music critics suspected this name was a pseudonym for White.

Critical reception
The New York Times called the song "catchier than anything on the radio by the White Stripes." The Guardian called it "insanely catchy", though "the archetypal comic novelty single." Josh Tyrangiel with Time magazine also praised the track. NMEs Piers Martin wrote "[Electric Six] rustle up the sort of pop-party thrash which sounds like the idiot half-brother to The Rapture’s 'House Of Jealous Lovers'. That good." The song is listed at number 234 on the best songs of the 2000s by Pitchfork Media. It was also featured in The Pitchfork 500. Writing for The Village Voice, Amy Phillips said, "The two men shout declarations of affection to each other over a sizzling Saturday Night Fever groove, and the sax sounds as if it's being played by someone with a long, luscious mullet. The video features taxidermy and a glowing codpiece."

Music video
The video for this song was produced by Tom Kuntz and Mike Maguire. Set in a manor house, it shows lead singer Dick Valentine and actress Tina Kanarek as a wealthy couple, outfitted with a brightly flashing codpiece and bra respectively. Paintings featured in the video were created by artist Brian Rea.

Track listingsUS CD single "Danger! High Voltage" (Soulchild Radio Mix)
 "I Lost Control (Of My Rock & Roll)"
 "Remote Control (Me)"
 "Danger! High Voltage" (Thin White Duke remix by Jacques Lu Cont)UK CD1 "Danger! High Voltage" (Soulchild radio mix)
 "I Lost Control (Of My Rock & Roll)"UK CD2 "Danger! High Voltage" (Soulchild 12-inch Blitz mix)
 "Danger! High Voltage" (Thin White Duke mix)
 "Danger! High Voltage" (Kilogram remix)UK 7-inch singleA. "Danger! High Voltage" (original 7-inch mix)
B. "I Lost Control (Of My Rock & Roll)"Australian CD single'''
 "Danger! High Voltage" (Soulchild radio mix)
 "I Lost Control (Of My Rock & Roll)"
 "Remote Control (Me)"
 "Danger! High Voltage" (Soulchild 12-inch Blitz mix)
 "Danger! High Voltage" (Kilogram mix)

Charts

Weekly charts

Year-end charts

Certifications

Release history

Notes

References

Bibliography

Handyside, Chris (2004). Fell in Love with a Band: The Story of The White Stripes''. Location unknown:St. Martin's Griffin

External links
 
 Pitchfork review

2001 songs
2002 debut singles
2003 singles
Electric Six songs
Jack White
Number-one singles in Scotland
UK Independent Singles Chart number-one singles
Male vocal duets
XL Recordings singles